Taeniogramma is a genus of moths in the family Geometridae erected by Paul Dognin in 1914.

Species
Taeniogramma odrussa (Druce, 1892) Mexico, Guatemala, Costa Rica
Taeniogramma costimacula Dognin, 1914 Panama
Taeniogramma punctolineata (Dognin, 1902) Ecuador
Taeniogramma melanorrhoea (Dyar, 1913) Mexico
Taeniogramma lineata (Dognin, 1913) Colombia
Taeniogramma paulensis (Schaus, 1901) Brazil (São Paulo)
Taeniogramma quadrilinea (Schaus, 1901) Arizona, Mexico
Taeniogramma octolineata (Hulst, 1887) Arizona
Taeniogramma mendicata (Hulst, 1887) southern Arizona, southern New Mexico, Texas
Taeniogramma tenebrosata (Hulst, 1887) Arizona, New Mexico, southern California, Mexico

References

Geometridae